Sticteulima richteri is a species of ectoparasitic sea snail, a marine gastropod mollusk in the family Eulimidae.

Distribution
This species occurs in the Atlantic Ocean off the Canary Islands, Madeira, Cape Verde, Savage Islands and Angola.

References

 Engl W. (1997). New species of the family Eulimidae from the Canary Islands. Part I: Description of Sticteulima richteri n. sp.. La Conchiglia 283: 44-47

richteri
Molluscs of the Atlantic Ocean
Molluscs of Madeira
Molluscs of the Canary Islands
Molluscs of Angola
Gastropods of Cape Verde
Molluscs described in 1997